Admiral Sir John Peter Lorne Reid GCB CVO (10 January 1903 – 26 September 1973) was a Royal Navy officer who went on to be Controller of the Navy.

Naval career
Reid joined the Royal Navy as a cadet in 1916. He served in World War II in operations off Norway and then off Algeria before taking part in the Battle of Cape Matapan in 1941. He was Chief Signal Officer to Field Marshal Lord Wavell during defence of the East Indies in 1941 and then served on the staff of Sir James Somerville, Commander-in-Chief, Eastern Fleet, in 1942 before becoming deputy director of the Signals Division in 1943.

After the War he commanded HMS Dido and then HMS Cleopatra. He was appointed Chief of Staff to the Commander-in-Chief, Portsmouth in 1951 and Second in Command of the Mediterranean Fleet in 1954. His last appointment was as Controller of the Navy in 1956 before he retired in 1961.

He lived in Bolton in East Lothian and in retirement was a Member of the Livingston New Town Corporation.

Family
In 1933 he married Jean Dundas; they had one son and one daughter.

References

|-

|-

1903 births
1973 deaths
Royal Navy admirals
Royal Navy officers of World War II
Knights Grand Cross of the Order of the Bath
Commanders of the Royal Victorian Order
Lords of the Admiralty